Daniel W. Hamilton is an American lawyer, formerly Dean and Richard J. Morgan Professor of Law at William S. Boyd School of Law, University of Nevada, Las Vegas.  His doctorate is in American legal history (2003, Harvard University); he was a Golieb Fellow in Legal History at New York University School of Law (2003-04 academic year); he received his J.D. from George Washington University and his B.A. from Oberlin College.

References

Year of birth missing (living people)
Living people
University of Nevada, Las Vegas faculty
American lawyers
Harvard University alumni
Oberlin College alumni
New York University School of Law alumni
George Washington University Law School alumni